Conus sculletti, common name Scullett's cone, is a species of sea snail, a marine gastropod mollusk in the family Conidae, the cone snails and their allies.

Like all species within the genus Conus, these snails are predatory and venomous. They are capable of "stinging" humans, therefore live ones should be handled carefully or not at all.

Description
The size of the shell varies between 30 mm and 50 mm.

Distribution
This marine species is endemic to Australia and occurs off New South Wales and Queensland

References

External links
 The Conus Biodiversity website
 Cone Shells – Knights of the Sea
 

sculletti
Gastropods described in 1962
Gastropods of Australia